The Directorate General of Highways (DGH) is the government agency under the Ministry of Transportation and Communications of the Republic of China (Taiwan) responsible for highway transportation management.

Organizational structures
 Reconsideration Committee for Traffic Accident Investigation
 Civil Service Ethics Office
 Accounting Office
 Personnel Office
 Secretariat
 Information Management Office
 Motor Vehicles Division
 Equipment and Supplies Division
 Land Acquisition Division
 Maintenance Division
 Construction and Design Division
 Planning Division
 Highway Disaster Prevention Center

Director-Generals
 Chen Yen-po
 Hsu Cheng-chang (incumbent)

See also
 Executive Yuan
 Highway system in Taiwan

External links

 

Executive Yuan
Highways in Taiwan
Government of Taiwan